Baxtergate may refer to

Baxter Gate, a street in Doncaster, South Yorkshire
Baxtergate, a street in Grimsby, North East Lincolnshire
Baxtergate, a street Walkley, South Yorkshire
Baxtergate, a street Whitby, North Yorkshire
, a British cargo ship in service 1951-60